National Check Professionals are banking professionals that have taken an exam to be certified in the check image exchange process. This includes the rules and regulations for handling disputes, duplicates, fraudulent and duplicate checks.

References 

Professional certification in finance
Cheques